The Elections and Registration Act 1915 (5&6 Geo.5 c.76) was a war time act of the Parliament of the United Kingdom that postponed local elections and the preparation of registers of electors. Initially the postponement was for one year, but the Act was renewed annually until the electoral cycle was resumed in 1919 following the cessation of hostilities.

Background 
Elections to local authorities in the United Kingdom were held annually in either April or November. In August 1914 war broke out, although this did not initially effect the municipal elections which were duly held in November 1914 and April 1915.

A coalition government was formed in May 1915, and in June it was announced that the cabinet intended to introduce legislation to both extend the life of Parliament by a year to 1917, and also to postpone the November 1915 borough elections. The postponement of elections would also mean that local authorities would not need to compile new electoral registers.

The Elections and Registration Bill was duly introduced to the Commons only 22 July. The bill passed all stages in both houses rapidly, and received the royal assent on 29 July.

Provisions
The Act was a short document containing only four sections.

Section 1 provided that the.. 
"next statutory elections of county and borough councillors, district councillors, guardians, and parish councillors, shall be postponed for a year, and the term of office of the existing councillors and guardians shall accordingly be extended by one year.'" Elections were no longer to be required to fill casual vacancies occurring in the membership of local councils and boards. Instead a vacant seat was to "be filled by means of the choice by the council or board of a person"... and  "a councillor or guardian so chosen shall hold office in the same manner in all respects as if he had been elected to fill the vacancy".
Section 2 exempted the Common Council of the City of London from the Act.
Section 3 provided that the parliamentary and local government register of electors in force at the time of the passing of the Act, should remain in force until 31 December 1916.
Section 4 dealt with the application of the Act to Scotland and Ireland.

Renewal
With the continuation of the war until November 1918, the provisions of the 1915 legislation had to be renewed on three occasions by the Parliament and Local Elections Acts of 1916, 1917 and the Parliament and Local Elections (No. 2) Act, 1917.

See also
Local Elections and Register of Electors (Temporary Provisions) Act 1939, similar legislation operative for the duration of World War II .
 Coronavirus Act 2020 sections 59 to 70, which similarly suspended elections for a year during the COVID-19 pandemic.

References

Local government in the United Kingdom
United Kingdom Acts of Parliament 1915
Local government legislation in England and Wales
Election law in the United Kingdom
Election legislation